Crack is a monthly independent music and culture magazine distributed across Europe.

Founded in Bristol in the UK in 2009, the magazine has featured Björk, MF Doom, Lil Yachty, FKA twigs, Gorillaz and Queens of the Stone Age on the cover. The same team, still based in Bristol are also involved with the curation of Simple Things Festival there.

History
Crack was founded in 2009 by graphic designer Jake Applebee and journalism graduate Thomas Frost.

In 2012, they secured the first independent music magazine interview with Flying Lotus ahead of his fourth studio album Until The Quiet Comes.

In 2015, the magazine launched a Berlin edition. In 2017, they launched an edition in Amsterdam.

In May 2019, they launched their 100th issue with Radiohead frontman Thom Yorke.

References

Monthly magazines published in the United Kingdom
Music magazines published in the United Kingdom
Free magazines
2009 establishments in the United Kingdom
Magazines established in 2009
Mass media in Bristol